Federal elections were held in Germany on 20 May 1928. The Social Democratic Party of Germany (SPD) remained the largest party in the Reichstag after winning 153 of the 491 seats. Voter turnout was 75.6%.

The only two parties to gain significantly were the SPD, which received almost a third of the vote, and the Communist Party of Germany (KPD), which completed a thorough victory of the left wing. However, the SPD still failed to win a clear majority, resulting in another coalition government, led by Hermann Müller. Following his appointment as Chancellor, Müller, who had previously held the post for four months in 1920, created a grand coalition of members of the SPD, the German Democratic Party, the Centre Party and the German People's Party. However, the coalition was plagued by internal divisions right from the beginning, with each party more concerned with their own interests than the interests of the government. As a result, Müller asked German President Paul von Hindenburg for emergency powers, but when Hindenburg refused, he resigned, marking the end of the "last genuinely democratic government of the Weimar Republic" on 27 March 1930.

The recently reformed Nazi Party contested the elections after the ban on the party had been lifted in 1925. However, the party received less than 3% of the vote and won only 12 seats in the Reichstag. Adolf Hitler, who had been incarcerated in Landsberg prison for his involvement in the Beer Hall Putsch until Christmas 1924, had concentrated on re-establishing himself as the leader of the Nazi Party after his release rather than on his party's electability.

Results

See also
Members of the 4th German Reichstag (Weimar Republic)

References

Germany
1928 elections in Germany
Elections in the Weimar Republic
Federal elections in Germany
May 1928 events